Madeleine Wuilloud (born 5 April 1946) is a Swiss former alpine skier who competed in the 1968 Winter Olympics.

References
Madeleine Wuilloud's profile at Sports Reference.com
Madeleine Wuilloud's profile at Swiss Olympians

1946 births
Living people
Swiss female alpine skiers
Olympic alpine skiers of Switzerland
Alpine skiers at the 1968 Winter Olympics
People from Fribourg
Sportspeople from the canton of Fribourg